Len Stevens (born May 19, 1942) is a retired American college basketball coach.  He was the head coach at St. Martin's College (1978–1981), Washington State University (1983–1987), and the University of Nevada (1987–1993).
 
Before St. Martin's in Lacey, Washington, Stevens was the head coach at Jesuit High School in Sacramento, California. He played college basketball at Sacramento State College, and was an assistant at Washington State for two seasons under George Raveling before becoming the head coach in 1983. After Nevada, he opened a restaurant in Reno, coached in Switzerland, and was an assistant coach at UC Irvine.

After coaching, Stevens was CEO of the chamber of commerce in Reno and retired in 2016.

References

External links
 Sports Reference – Len Stevens

1942 births
Living people
American expatriate basketball people in Switzerland
American men's basketball coaches
American men's basketball players
California State University, Sacramento alumni
College men's basketball head coaches in the United States
High school basketball coaches in the United States
Nevada Wolf Pack men's basketball coaches
Sacramento State Hornets men's basketball players
Saint Martin's Saints men's basketball coaches
UC Irvine Anteaters men's basketball coaches
Washington State Cougars men's basketball coaches